For Dancers Only is an album by jazz pianist Junior Mance and bassist Martin Rivera that was released on the Sackville label in 1983.

Reception

Allmusic reviewer Scott Yanow described the album as "Accessible yet creative music, recommended to a wide audience".

Track listing
All compositions by Junior Mance, except where indicated.
 "Harlem Lullaby" - 7:10
 "Girl of My Dreams" (Sunny Clapp) - 4:17
 "Prelude to a Kiss" (Duke Ellington, Irving Gordon, Irving Mills) - 4:45
 "Come on Home" (Horace Silver) - 5:51
 "For Dancers Only" (Sy Oliver, Don Raye, Vic Schoen) - 4:55
 "Run 'Em Around" - 4:43
 "Summertime" (George Gershwin, DuBose Heyward) - 11:56

Personnel
Junior Mance - piano 
Martin Rivera - bass

References

1983 albums
Junior Mance albums
Sackville Records albums